The province of Gorontalo in Indonesia is divided into 5 regencies (kabupaten) and one city (kota), which in turn are divided administratively into 77 districts, known as Kecamantan.

The districts of Gorontalo, with the regency or city each falls into, are as follows:

Anggrek, Gorontalo Utara
Asparaga, Gorontalo
Atinggola, Gorontalo Utara
Batudaa, Gorontalo
Batudaa Pantai, Gorontalo
Biau, Gorontalo Utara
Bilato, Gorontalo
Biluhu, Gorontalo
Boliohuto, Gorontalo
Bongomeme, Gorontalo
Bone, Bone Bolango
Bone Raya, Bone Bolango
Bone Pantai, Bone Bolango
Botumoita, Boalemo
Botupingge, Bone Bolango
Bulango Selatan, Bone Bolango
Bulango Timur, Bone Bolango
Bulango Ulu, Bone Bolango
Bulango Utara, Bone Bolango
Bulawa, Bone Bolango
Buntulia, Pohuwato
Dengilo, Pohuwato
Dulupi, Boalemo
Dumbo Raya, Gorontalo City (kota)
Duhiadaa, Pohuwato
Dungaliyo, Gorontalo
Dungingi, Gorontalo City (kota)
Gentuma Raya, Gorontalo Utara
Hulonthalangi, Gorontalo City (kota)
Jomilito, Gorontalo Utara
Kabila, Bone Bolango
Kabila Bone, Bone Bolango
Kota Barat, Gorontalo City (kota)
Kota Selatan, Gorontalo City (kota)
Kota Tengah, Gorontalo City (kota)
Kota Timur, Gorontalo City (kota)
Kota Utara, Gorontalo City (kota)
Kwandang, Gorontalo Utara
Lemito, Pohuwato
Limboto, Gorontalo
Limboto Barat, Gorontalo
Mananggu, Boalemo
Marisa, Pohuwato
Monano, Gorontalo Utara
Mootilango, Gorontalo
Paguat, Pohuwato
Paguyaman, Boalemo
Paguyaman Pantai, Boalemo
Patilanggio, Pohuwato
Pinogu, Bone Bolango
Ponelo Kepulauan, Gorontalo Utara
Popayato, Pohuwato
Popayato Barat, Pohuwato
Popayato Timur, Pohuwato
Pulubala, Gorontalo
Randangan, Pohuwato
Sipatana, Gorontalo City (kota)
Sumalata, Gorontalo Utara
Sumalata Timur, Gorontalo Utara
Suwawa, Bone Bolango
Suwawa Selatan, Bone Bolango
Suwawa Tengah, Bone Bolango
Suwawa Timur, Bone Bolango
Tabongo, Gorontalo
Talaga Jaya, Gorontalo
Taluditi, Pohuwato
Tapa, Bone Bolango
Telaga, Gorontalo
Telaga Biru, Gorontalo
Tibawa, Gorontalo
Tilamuta, Boalemo
Tilango, Gorontalo
Tilongkabila, Bone Bolango
Tolangohula, Gorontalo
Tolinggula, Gorontalo Utara
Wanggarasi, Pohuwato
Wonosari, Boalemo

 

 
Gorontalo